Sayyid Ebrahim Raisolsadati (born 14 December 1960), commonly known as Ebrahim Raisi, is an Iranian principlist politician, Muslim jurist, and the eighth and current president of Iran since 3 August 2021, having been elected to the presidency in the 2021 election.

Raisi has served in several positions in Iran's judicial system, such as Deputy Chief Justice (2004–2014), Attorney General (2014–2016), and Chief Justice (2019–2021). He was also Prosecutor and Deputy Prosecutor of Tehran in the 1980s and 1990s. He was Custodian and Chairman of Astan Quds Razavi, a bonyad, from 2016 until 2019. He is a member of Assembly of Experts from South Khorasan Province, being elected for the first time in the 2006 election. He is the son-in-law of Mashhad Friday prayer leader and Grand Imam of Imam Reza shrine, Ahmad Alamolhoda.

Raisi ran for president in 2017 as the candidate of the conservative Popular Front of Islamic Revolution Forces, losing to moderate incumbent President Hassan Rouhani, 57% to 38.3%. He was one of the four people on the prosecution committee, which was responsible for the execution of thousands of political prisoners in Iran in 1988 and is hence labeled the "death committee". He is sanctioned by the U.S. Office of Foreign Assets Control in accordance with Executive Order 13876. He is accused of crimes against humanity by international human rights organizations and United Nations special rapporteurs.

Raisi successfully ran for president a second time in 2021 with 62.9% of the votes, succeeding Hassan Rouhani. According to many observers, the 2021 Iranian presidential election was rigged in favour of Raisi, who is considered an ally of Ali Khamenei. Raisi is often seen as a frontrunner to succeed Khamenei as Supreme Leader. Considered a hardliner in Iranian politics, Raisi's presidency has seen deadlock in negotiations with the U.S. over the Joint Comprehensive Plan of Action (JCPOA) and large-scale protests throughout the country in late 2022, triggered by the death of Mahsa Amini on 16 September.

Early life

Ebrahim Raisi was born on 14 December 1960 to a clerical family in the Noghan district of Mashhad. His father, Seyed Haji, died when he was 5.

Ancestry 
Ancestrally, Raisi is among Husayn ibn Ali (Hussaini) Sayyids, and he is connected to Ali ibn Husayn Zayn al-Abidin Sayyids.

Academic education
Raisi passed his primary-education in "Javadiyeh school"; then started studying in the Hawza (Islamic seminary). In 1975, he went to "Ayatollah Boroujerdi School" in order to continue his education in Qom Seminary. He has claimed to have received a doctorate degree in Private law from Motahari University; however, this has been disputed.

Clerical credentials 
He began his studies at the Qom Seminary at the age of 15. He then decided to study in the Navvab school for a short time. After that, he went to Ayatollah Sayyed Muhammad Mousavi Nezhad school, where he studied while also teaching other students. In 1976, he went to Qom to continue his studies at the Ayatollah Borujerdi school. He was a student of Seyyed Hossein Borujerdi, Morteza Motahhari, Abolghasem Khazali, Hossein Noori Hamedani, Ali Meshkini and Morteza Pasandideh. Raisi also passed his "KharejeFeqh" (external-Fiqh) to Seyyed Ali Khamenei and Mojtaba Tehrani. According to Alex Vatanka of the Middle East Institute, Raisi's "exact religious qualification" is a "sore point". "For a while" prior to investigation by the Iranian media, he "referred to himself" as "Ayatollah" on his personal website. However, according to Vatanka, the media "publicized his lack of formal religious education" and credentials, after which Raisi ceased claiming to hold the aforementioned rank. After this investigation and criticism he "refer[ed] to himself as hojat-ol-eslam", a clerical rank immediately beneath that of Ayatollah. Raisi subsequently again declared himself an Ayatollah shortly before the 2021 presidential election. The decree by Supreme Leader Ali Khamenei appointing him as President, refers to him as a hojat-ol-eslam.

Judicial career

Early years
In 1981, he was appointed the prosecutor of Karaj. Later on, he was also appointed as Prosecutor of Hamadan and served both positions together. He was simultaneously active in two cities more than 300 km away from each other. After four months, he was appointed as Prosecutor of Hamadan Province.

Tehran deputy prosecutor
He was appointed as Deputy prosecutor of Tehran in 1985 and moved to the capital. After three years and in early 1988, he was placed in the attention of Ruhollah Khomeini and received special provisions (independent from judiciary) from him to address legal issues in some provinces like Lorestan, Semnan and Kermanshah.

1988 executions

Hussein-Ali Montazeri named Raisi as one of the four persons involved in the 1988 executions of Iranian political prisoners. Other persons were Morteza Eshraghi (Prosecutor of Tehran), Hossein-Ali Nayeri (Judge) and Mostafa Pourmohammadi (MOI representative in Evin). Names of first two persons are mentioned in Khomeini's order. Pourmohammadi has denied his role but Raisi has not commented publicly on the matter yet. Due to the involvement of this prosecution committee in thousands of executions, it has been informally called the 'death committee'.

The 1988 executions of Iranian political prisoners were a series of state-sponsored executions of political prisoners across Iran, starting on 19 July 1988 and lasting for approximately five months. The majority of those killed were supporters of the People's Mujahedin of Iran, although supporters of other leftist factions, including the Fedaian and the Tudeh Party of Iran (Communist Party), were executed as well. According to Amnesty International, "thousands of political dissidents were systematically subjected to enforced disappearance in Iranian detention facilities across the country and extrajudicially executed pursuant to an order issued by the Supreme Leader of Iran and implemented across prisons in the country. Many of those killed during this time were subjected to torture and other cruel, inhuman or degrading treatment or punishment in the process."

The killings have been described as a political purge without precedent in modern Iranian history, both in terms of scope and coverup. However, the exact number of prisoners executed remains a point of contention. Amnesty International, after interviewing dozens of relatives, puts the number in thousands; and then-Supreme Leader Ruhollah Khomeini's deputy, Hussein-Ali Montazeri put the number between 2,800 and 3,800 in his memoirs, but an alternative estimation suggests that the number exceeded 30,000. Because of the large number, prisoners were loaded into forklift trucks in groups of six and hanged from cranes in half-hour intervals.

Senior positions
After Khomeini's death and election of Ali Khamenei as the new Supreme Leader, Raisi was appointed as Tehran prosecutor by newly appointed Chief-Justice Mohammad Yazdi. He held the office for five years from 1989 to 1994. In 1994, he was appointed as head of General Inspection Office.

From 2004 until 2014, Raisi served as First Deputy Chief Justice of Iran, being appointed by Chief Justice Mahmoud Hashemi Shahroudi. He kept his position in Sadeq Larijani's first term as Chief Justice. He was later appointed as Attorney-General of Iran in 2014, a position that he held until 2016, when he resigned to become Chairman of Astan Quds Razavi. He has also served as Special Clerical Court prosecutor by the order of the Supreme Leader, Seyyed Ali Khamenei since 2012.

Other positions 
Raisi was a member of the board of trustees of Execution of Imam Khomeini's Order for ten years by order of Seyyed Ali Khamenei. He was also a member of the "Supreme Selection Board". He is the founder of "Fatemeh Al-Zahra Seminary" (in Tehran) and the first secretary of the headquarters for reviving the enjoining good and forbidding wrong in the country. He was appointed as the prosecutor of Hamedan province, and was active there for three years since 1982 to 1984.

His other executive and oversight responsibilities include the positions such as: membership in the "Supreme Council of Cyberspace", "the Monetary and Credit Council", and "the Anti-Corruption Headquarters".

Astan Quds chairmanship
He became chairman of Astan Quds Razavi on 7 March 2016 after the death of his predecessor Abbas Vaez-Tabasi, a position which he stayed in until 2019. He is the second person to serve this office from 1979. Supreme Leader Ali Khamenei enumerated serving the pilgrims of the holy shrine, especially poor people and also serve nearby, especially the poor and dispossessed as two important responsibilities of Raisi in his appointment order.

2017 presidential election

Raisi was named as one of the Popular Front of Islamic Revolution Forces (JAMNA)'s presidential candidates in February 2017. His candidacy was also supported by the Front of Islamic Revolution Stability. He officially announced his nomination in a statement published on 6 April, and called it his “religious and revolutionary responsibility to run”, citing the need for a “fundamental change in the executive management of the country” and a government that “fights poverty and corruption.”
He registered on 14 April 2017 at Ministry of Interior with saying it's time to perform citizenship rights, not only writing act.

On 15 May 2017, conservative candidate Mohammad Bagher Ghalibaf withdrew his candidacy in favor of Raisi. It was speculated that Ghalibaf would be Raisi's first vice president if he was elected. They also joined in a campaign rally in Tehran with each other.

After election results were announced, Raisi received 15,786,449 out of 42,382,390 (38.30% of the votes). He lost to incumbent President Rouhani and ranked second. He did not congratulate Rouhani on his re-election as the president, and asked the Guardian Council to look into "violations of the law" before and during the elections, with 100 pages of attached documentation.

Presidency

2021 presidential election

In 2021, Raisi ran again for the presidency and won the election. The election had a 48.8% turnout, and 63% went to Raisi. Out of 28.9 million votes, around 3.7 million votes were not counted, likely because they were blank or otherwise invalid protest votes. According to many observers, the 2021 Iranian presidential election was rigged in favour of Raisi. 

Almost 600 candidates, 40 of which were female, registered in the election, of which 7 men were approved a month before the election by the 12 jurists and theologians on the Guardian Council (an unelected body that has the final decision on candidate validity based on the strength of 'the candidates' qualifications'). Three of those seven candidates were subsequently pulled out before polling day. Before he withdrew, reformist candidate Mohsen Mehralizadeh hinted that the vote would be a foregone conclusion, saying during a candidates' TV debate that the ruling clerics had aligned "sun, moon and the heavens to make one particular person the president," according to The Economist. Former President Mahmoud Ahmadinejad, among those barred from running, said in a video message that he would not vote, declaring: "I do not want to have a part in this sin."

Tenure

Raisi was appointed as the incumbent President of Iran on 3 August 2021, through a decree issued by the Supreme Leader Ali Khamenei. During his inauguration speech, Raisi stated that his government would seek to lift the sanctions on Iran imposed by the United States, but added that it would not let foreigners dictate how its economy is run. He was sworn-in before the Islamic Consultative Assembly on 5 August during a ceremony attended by around 260 officials, both from Iran and other countries. In his speech, he stated that Iran was actually responsible for stabilising the Middle East, that he would resist foreign pressure on Iran but widen its external relations, especially with Iran's neighbours, promised to support any diplomatic move to lift the American sanctions and assured that Iran's nuclear programme was only meant for peaceful purposes. He also promised that he would try to improve the quality of life for Iranians and defend human rights.

Raisi appointed Mohammad Mokhber, the head of the Execution of Imam Khomeini’s Order foundation, as the First Vice President of Iran on 8 August. , a former spokesman for the judiciary, was also appointed as Raisi's chief of staff.
 On 11 August, Raisi appointed former Minister of Petroleum and Minister of Commerce Masoud Mir Kazemi as a Vice President and head of the Plan and Budget Organization. He also presented nominations for his cabinet before the Islamic Consultative Assembly on the same day.

Raisi's nomination of Ahmad Vahidi as Minister of Interior among his cabinet nominations was quickly strongly condemned by both Argentina and Israel, with the former having requested his arrest through a red notice of Interpol for his alleged involvement in the 1994 AMIA bombing in Buenos Aires. The Argentine foreign ministry stated that Vahidi's designation was an "affront to the Argentine justice and the victims of the terrorist attack".

On 20 August, Raisi appointed former Minister of Culture Mohammad Hosseini as Vice President for Parliamentary Affairs. 18 out of 19 of his cabinet picks were approved by the Islamic Consultative Assembly on 25 August, except Hossein Baghgoli, whom Raisi had chosen as the Minister of Education. Many of the ministerial choices are sanctioned by the United States and several are veterans of the Islamic Republic of Iran Armed Forces.

Raisi meanwhile appointed former IRGC commander-in-chief Mohsen Rezaee as the Vice President for Economic Affairs on 25 August. On 26 August, Iran had a renewed diplomatic clash with Argentina, when the latter condemned the appointment of Rezaee. Rezaee is also wanted by Argentina for alleged involvement in the AMIA bombing. Argentina "energetically" condemned his designation and added that "Iran must cooperate with the investigation" and added again that Rezaee's designation was another "affront to the Argentine justice".

On 1 September, Raisi appointed former President of Al-Zahra University Ensieh Khazali as Vice President for Women and Family Affairs and Mohammad Dehghan as Vice President for Legal Affairs. On 4 September, he stated that Iran would resume talks over its nuclear programme, which have been stalled since his election victory, but not under pressure from Western countries.

On 5 September, Raisi appointed Meysam Latifi, former dean of Islamic education and management at Imam Sadiq University, as a Vice President and Head of the Administrative and Recruitment Affairs Organization, while Sowlat Mortazavi was appointed as Vice President for Executive Affairs and Head of the Presidential Administration. In addition,  former Head of Management and Planning Organization Farhad Rahbar was appointed as the President's Assistant for Economic Affairs. Amir-Hossein Ghazizadeh Hashemi was appointed as a Vice President and the Head of the Foundation of Martyrs and Veterans Affairs on 12 September.

Importation of COVID-19 vaccine meanwhile surged since Raisi took office, with over 30 million doses being imported during the Iranian month of Shahrivar, more than the vaccine imports since February 2021, while 13.4 million were imported during the month of Mordad in which Raisi was sworn-in. The Ministry of Foreign Affairs announced importation of 60 million more vaccines on 19 September. In a pre-recorded speech before the 76th session of the United Nations General Assembly on 21 September, Raisi stated that Iran wanted to resume talks over its nuclear programme. He also stated that the hegemony of the United States was being rejected across the world and criticised its sanctions on Iran as unjust.

On September 17, protests erupted after the death of Mahsa Amini, and unrest spreaded all over the country. President Raisi promised to set up a commission to investigate the murder, but this did not affect the protests, as law-enforcement agencies are allegedly retreating from small cities due to uncontrollable rioting.

Foreign policy 
After the fall of Kabul to the Taliban, Raisi stated on 16 August that the withdrawal of American forces from Afghanistan offered a chance for stabilising the country, which Iran would support. He also called on all parties to form an inclusive government. On 4 September, he urged that elections be held to elect a new Afghan government as soon as possible. On 18 September, he stated that Iran will not allow establishment of any terrorist group, including the Islamic State, along its border with Afghanistan and use it for attacks on other nations. In addition, he called on Taliban to form an inclusive government.

In April 2022, Raisi warned that Israel will be targeted by his country's armed forces if it makes "the slightest move" against Iran. During an interview in September of that year, he denounced the Abraham Accords, called Israel a "false regime" and questioned whether the Holocaust happened.

Raisi said that his government's priority in the meeting with Syrian President Bashar al-Assad was to strengthen strategic ties between Iran and Syria.

He criticized the Saudi-led blockade of Yemen and called for a ceasefire.

In March 2022, according to Foreign Policy, Raisi pledged alliance in favor of Russia when the conflict surrounding the Russo-Ukrainian War started.

Negotiations with the U.S. over the Joint Comprehensive Plan of Action (JCPOA) have continued to be stalled under Raisi. with him accusing the Americans of "delaying and dragging their feet".

Between 14-17 February 2023, Raisi visited China and met Chinese leader Xi Jinping. During the meeting, the two countries signed 20 cooperation agreements and agreed to boost relations. Following the talks, Saudi Arabia and Iran agreed to restore diplomatic ties cut in 2016 on 10 March after a deal brokered between the two countries by China following secret talks in Beijing.

Political views

Raisi is widely considered to be a hardliner in Iranian politics. He strongly supports sex segregation. He said in a 2014 interview about a planned segregation in Tehran Municipality that "I think this is a good move because the majority of women do a better job in a totally relaxed atmosphere and fit are required." He is also a supporter of Islamization of universities, revision of the Internet and censorship of Western culture. Raisi claims he sees economic sanctions as an opportunity. Raisi said: "We will have guidance patrols, but for managers." He also said: "If the government does well, the people will do well." He has said that the amputation of thieves' hands, which is based on a very strict interpretation of Sharia, is one of "our honours" and that such punishments will not be limited to now and will be continued in the future. He has said that he should be honoured and esteemed for his role in the 1988 Iranian mass executions of political prisoners.

Raisi is one of nine Iranian officials listed in November 2019 subjected to sanctions by the United States Department of State due to alleged human rights abuses. He is currently sanctioned by the U.S. Office of Foreign Assets Control in accordance with Executive Order 13876. He is accused of crimes against humanity by international human rights organizations and United Nations special rapporteurs. A formal request had been made to arrest Raisi for crimes against humanity, if he attended the 2021 United Nations Climate Change Conference in Scotland.

Economy
In 2017, Raisi reported "I see the activation of a resistance economy as the only way to end poverty and deprivation in the country." He supports development of the agricultural sector over commercial retail, which "will eventually benefit foreign brands."

In 2017, he promised to triple the monthly state benefits, currently Rls.450,000 per citizen, in order to tackle corruption and create six million jobs. He said (about sanctions against Iran): "Sanctions should be seen as an opportunity for economic empowerment, and we should strengthen ourselves instead of falling short."

Raisi said in regards to the issue of lifting sanctions: "every government that takes office (to be elected), should lift the oppressive sanctions, and it must be pursued seriously; and the neutralization of sanctions should be on the agenda and we should not condition the economy; Neither the corona nor the flood nor the sanctions should have an impact."

Cultural 
According to Raisi: No one has the right to violate the freedom and rights of girls and women; he said: "It is incomplete to talk about culture and economy without the role of women"; "Women's rights are God-given, and the government should not only not lose this right, but it should also create the conditions for it to flourish." He mentioned: in many spaces, women's role-playing is empty and women's talent, creativity, initiative and innovation can be used a lot.

Raisi stated: "The intellectual of the society understands before the others and watches the threats of the society and soon warns the society with his poetry and art and saves the society from falling asleep like a muezzin"; According to him, supporting the people of culture and art should not be verbal and should lead to action. He said: Teachers are the true intellectuals of society and must observe and warn of harm; Teachers are the identifiers and civilizers of society.

Homosexuality 
Raisi has said that same-sex relations are "nothing but savagery."

Possible successor as Supreme Leader 

Raisi has been described as "a favorite and possible successor" to Iran’s supreme leader, Ayatollah Ali Khamenei, by several sources. In 2019, Saeid Golkar of Al Jazeera called Raisi "the most likely successor of Ayatollah Ali Khamenei" as Supreme Leader of Iran. In 2020, Dexter Filkins described him as "frequently mentioned" as a successor to Khamenei.

Electoral history

Personal life
Raisi is married to Jamileh Alamolhoda, daughter of Mashhad Friday Prayers Imam, Ahmad Alamolhoda. She is an associate professor at Tehran's Shahid Beheshti University and also president of the university's Institute of Fundamental Studies of Science and Technology. They have two daughters and two grandchildren. One of their daughters studied at Sharif University and the other one at Tehran University.

Works 
Among Raisi's works are as follows: The books of "Lectures on the rules of jurisprudence" including 3 volumes (in judicial, economic and religious sections); Erse-Bi-Wares (Inheritance without heirs); Conflict of principle and appearance in jurisprudence and law.

References

External links
 

Ebrahim Raisi
1960 births
Living people
Presidents of Iran
People from Khorasan
People from Mashhad
Anti-Americanism
Chief justices of Iran
Combatant Clergy Association politicians
Academic staff of Imam Sadiq University
Iranian ayatollahs
Iranian individuals subject to the U.S. Department of the Treasury sanctions
Iranian prosecutors
Iranian Islamists
21st-century Iranian judges
Islamic Republican Party politicians
Members of the Assembly of Experts
Popular Front of Islamic Revolution Forces politicians
Qom Seminary alumni
Representatives of the Supreme Leader
Shia Islamists
Specially Designated Nationals and Blocked Persons List
20th-century Iranian politicians
21st-century Iranian politicians
20th-century Persian-language writers
21st-century Persian-language writers